Castranova is a commune in Dolj County, Oltenia, Romania with a population of 3,644 people. It is composed of two villages, Castranova and Puțuri.

References

Communes in Dolj County
Localities in Oltenia